The Baltimore Ravens Ring of Honor is a display encircling the field of M&T Bank Stadium in Baltimore, Maryland, honoring former players and personnel who have made outstanding contributions to the Baltimore Ravens and Baltimore Colts football organizations.

The Ring of Honor began in 2000, with the induction of Earnest Byner. In 2002, eight former Baltimore Colts players were added, followed by the induction of then-owner Art Modell a year later. Ten players and former head coach Brian Billick have been inducted since, with the most recent addition being Marshal Yanda in 2022. Terrell Suggs is expected to be the next player added to the Ring of Honor.

Inductees

Key/Legend

References

External links
Baltimore Ravens Ring of Honor
Ravens Ring of Honor - Pinterest

Baltimore Ravens lists
Baltimore Colts
American football museums and halls of fame
Awards established in 2000